The 1936 Florida gubernatorial election was held on November 3, 1936. Democratic nominee Fred P. Cone defeated Republican nominee E.E. Callaway with 80.91% of the vote.

Primary elections
Primary elections were held on June 2, 1936.

Democratic primary

Candidates
Fred P. Cone, former State Senator
W. Raleigh Petteway, Judge of the Criminal Court of Record for Hillsborough County
William C. Hodges, State Senator
Jerry W. Carter, member of the Florida Railroad Commission.
B. F. Paty, attorney
Dan Chappell
Grady Burton
Peter Tomasello Jr., former Speaker of the State House and State Representative.
Stafford Caldwell
Amos Lewis
Mallie Martin, commissioner of the Florida State Road Department.
Carl Maples, lumber operator from Wakulla County.
Redmond B. Gautier, former mayor of Miami.
J. R. Yearwood

Results

General election

Candidates
Fred P. Cone, Democratic
Elvy Edison "E.E" Callaway, Republican, white lawyer for the NAACP.

Results

County results

References

1936
Florida
Gubernatorial